Darwin Ortiz (born 1948) is a magician, who is an authority on gambling and card manipulation.

Life and work
Ortiz was born and raised in New York City, where he had a keen interest in card tricks since childhood. In 1974, he dropped out of NYU Law School and pursued card magic full-time. During that time, he initially supported himself playing blackjack (using card counting techniques) and as an instructor at Harry Lorayne's memory school in New York City. Ortiz was a contemporary and close friend of the influential US coin magician, David Roth, and was initially mentored by the seminal British/US close-up performer, Derek Dingle.

Ortiz later became a consultant to a number of casinos in the United States, Europe, Africa, UK and Australasia, and was a regular featured presenter for a succession of years at the World Gaming Congress in Nevada.

Ortiz currently resides in Washington, D.C.

Books

Ortiz is the author of books on gambling and magic.  He is particularly respected for his written contributions on the theory of magic.  According to Vanishing Inc Magic, the site of magicians Joshua Jay and Andy Gladwin, "Darwin Ortiz is unparalleled in his theoretical writings. His two theory books, Designing Miracles and Strong Magic are, in our estimation, some of the most important writings on magic written in the last two decades."

His book Strong Magic focuses on practical presentational techniques for close-up magicians. The book has been broadly embraced by the professional and amateur magic community but initially met with negative reviews from the two major US trade publications MAGIC and Genii. Demand for the book has been high, despite the initial inability of the original publisher to reprint the text. Ownership of the copyright has recently returned to the author (along with two other books Darwin Ortiz At The Card Table and Cardshark) and the books are once again being made available to the trade.

Ortiz's second book on magic theory, Designing Miracles is an exposition on the design of powerful magical effects, and is subtitled Creating the Illusion of Impossibility. The book posits and analyzes various theories regarding the perception and cognition of lay audiences and provides practical examples and advice on the construction of effects, aimed at maximizing their impact and deceptiveness to a lay audience. 

The most recent book published with Darwin Ortiz's original routines was Lessons in Card Mastery. 

Ortiz's major work for the lay public on gaming protection is Gambling Scams 1984. He also authored an influential annotation of S. W. Erdnase's The Expert at the Card Table titled The Annotated Erdnase in 1991 which was published to the magic trade.

Bibliography

Notable works published by Darwin Ortiz include:
 Gambling Scams (1984)
 Darwin Ortiz on Casino Gambling (1986)
 Darwin Ortiz at the Card Table (1988)
 The Annotated Erdnase (1991)
 Strong Magic (1994)
 CardShark (1995)
 Scams and Fantasies with Cards (2002)
 Designing Miracles (2007)
 Darwin Ortiz Lessons in Card Mastery (2012)

References

Citations

Sources 
Darwin Ortiz, Cover and featured magician in Genii, Vol. 56, No. 5, March 1993, page 296

External links
Darwin Ortiz, Professional Magician & Game Protection Consultant

1948 births
Living people
American magicians
American male writers